Ramón López may refer to:

 Ramón López (baseball) (1933–1982), Cuban baseball pitcher
 Ramón López (triple jumper) (born 1936), Cuban triple jumper
 Ramón López (runner) (born 1963), Paraguayan long-distance and steeplechase runner
 Ramon Lopez (businessman), Philippine Department of Trade and Industry secretary
 Ramón López Irizarry (1897–1982), Puerto Rican educator and scientist who developed the original formula for Coco López. 
 Ramón E. López (born 1959), space physicist and author
 Ramon H. Lopez (born 1983), Filipino artist

See also
 José Ramón López (born 1950), Spanish sprint canoer